Blue Heron, also known as  Mine 18, is a former coal mining community or coal town on the banks of the Big South Fork of the Cumberland River in McCreary County, Kentucky, United States, that has been recreated and is maintained as an interpretive history area in the Big South Fork National River and Recreation Area.

Blue Heron was operated as a company town of the Stearns Coal and Lumber Company. Its coal mines opened in 1937 and operated until December 1962, when the underground mines closed down for lack of profitability. The town was abandoned, and its buildings were either removed or decayed. The community was "re-created" in the 1980s as an outdoor museum. Some of the original structures have been replicated as open, metal shells of buildings, referred to as "ghost structures," on the approximate sites of the original buildings. Structures include a railroad depot, a full-scale model of the coal tipple, a school, and homes. Photographic exhibits and audio programs in the ghost structures tell about various aspects of life in the isolated mining community.

See also 
 Barthell, Kentucky: Stearns Coal and Lumber Company town in McCreary County, Kentucky
 McCreary County Museum: Former headquarters of Stearns Coal and Lumber Company
 Justus Smith Stearns: Founder of Stearns Coal and Lumber Company
 Stearns, Kentucky: Stearns Coal and Lumber Company town in McCreary County, Kentucky

References

External links
National Park Service website about Blue Heron
Historic photographs of Blue Heron
Big South Fork Scenic Railway

Gallery

Coal towns in Kentucky
Ghost towns in Kentucky
Museums in McCreary County, Kentucky
Company towns in Kentucky
Populated places established in 1937
History museums in Kentucky
Open-air museums in Kentucky
Mining museums in Kentucky
1937 establishments in Kentucky